Villar may refer to:

Places

France
 Villar-en-Val, a town in the Aude département

Italy
 Villar Dora, a town in the Metropolitan City of Turin
 Villar Focchiardo, a town in the Metropolitan City of Turin
 Villar Pellice, a town in the Metropolitan City of Turin
 Villar Perosa, a town in the Metropolitan City of Turin
 Villar San Costanzo, a town in the province of Cuneo

Spain
 Villar del Ala, a town in the province of Soria, Castile and León
 Villar de Argañán, a town in the province of Salamanca, Castile and León
 Villar del Arzobispo, a town in the comarca of Los Serranos in the Valencian Community
 Villar del Buey, a town in the province of Zamora, Castile and León
 Villar del Campo, a town in the province of Soria, Castile and León
 Villar de Cañas, a town in the province of Cuenca, Castile-La Mancha
 Villar de Ciervo, a town in the province of Salamanca, Castile and León
 Villar del Cobo, a town in the province of Teruel, Aragon
 Villar de Corneja, a town in the province of Ávila, Castile and León
 Villar de Domingo García, a town in the province of Cuenca, Castile-La Mancha
 Villar de la Encina, a town in the province of Cuenca, Castile-La Mancha
 Villar de Fallaves, a town in the province of Zamora, Castile and León
 Villar de Gallimazo, a town in the province of Salamanca, Castile and León
 Villar del Humo, a town in the province of Cuenca, Castile-La Mancha
 Villar del Infantado, a town in the province of Cuenca, Castile-La Mancha
 Villar de los Navarros, a town in the province of Zaragoza, Aragon
 Villar de Olalla, a town in the province of Cuenca, Castile-La Mancha
 Villar del Pedroso, a town in the province of Cáceres, Extremadura
 Villar de Peralonso, a town in the province of Salamanca, Castile and León
 Villar de Plasencia, a town in the province of Cáceres, Extremadura
 Villar del Pozo, a town in the province of Ciudad Real, Castile-La Mancha
 Villar de Rena, a town in the province of Badajoz, Extremadura
 Villar del Río, a town in the province of Soria, Castile and León
 Villar de Samaniego, a town in the province of Salamanca, Castile and León
 Villar del Salz, a town in the province of Teruel, Aragon
 Villar y Velasco, a town in the province of Cuenca, Castile-La Mancha
 Villar de la Yegua, a town in the province of Salamanca, Castile and León

Other uses
Villar (surname)